Julia London is the pen name of Dinah Dinwiddie (born March 18, 1959), an American writer of romance novels.

Biography
Dinah Dinwiddie aka Julia London was born and raised on a ranch in Texas. She graduated from college and worked in Washington D.C., traveling extensively in the United States and Europe before returning to Texas. She was a public administrator before she finally decided to become a writer. Her historical and contemporary romance novels have made the bestseller lists of The New York Times, Publishers Weekly and USA Today. An award-winning author, she is a six-time finalist for the RITA Award..

Dinah lives in Texas with her dog, Moose.

Bibliography

Regent Street's Rogues & Family series
The Devil's Love	(1998/Dec)
Wicked Angel	(1999/May)
The Dangerous Gentleman	(2000/Apr)
The Ruthless Charmer	(2000/Oct)
The Beautiful Stranger	(2001/Jul)
The Secret Lover	(2002/May)

Lear Family Saga series
Material Girl	(2003/Aug)
Beauty Queen	(2004/Apr)
Miss Fortune	(2004/Nov)

Highlander Lockhart series
Highlander Unbound	(2004/Feb)
Highlander in Disguise	(2005/Feb)
Highlander in Love	(2005/Aug)

Thrillseekers, Anonymous series
Wedding Survivor	(2005/Oct)
Extreme Bachelor	(2006/Jun)
American Diva      (2007/Aug)

Desperate Debutantes series
The Hazards of Hunting a Duke	(2006/May)
The Perils of Pursuing a Prince	(2007/Apr)
The Dangers of Deceiving a Viscount (2007/Oct)

Scandalous series
The Book of Scandal (2008/Aug)
Highland Scandal	 (2009/Apr)
A Courtesan's Scandal (2009/Oct)

Cedar Springs series
Summer of Two Wishes    (2009/Aug)
One Season of Sunshine  (2010/Jun)
A Light at Winter's End (2011/Feb)

Secrets of Hadley Green series
The Year of Living Scandalously (2010/Oct)
The Revenge of Lord Eberlin (2012/Feb)
The Seduction of Lady X (2012/Mar)
The Last Debutante (2013/Mar)

The Cabot Sisters series
The Trouble With Honor (2014/Mar)
The Devil Takes a Bride (2015/Feb)
The Scoundrel and the Debutante (2015/April)

Homecoming Ranch series
Homecoming Ranch (2013/Aug)
Return to Homecoming Ranch (2014/Jul)
The Perfect Homecoming (2015/Mar)

Lake Haven series
"Suddenly in Love" (2016/Apr)
"Suddenly Dating" (2016/Nov)
"Suddenly Engaged" (2017/Jul)

Highland Groom series
"Wild Wicked Scot" (2017/Jan)
"Sinful Scottish Laird" (2017/Mar)
"Hard-Hearted Highlander" (2017/May)

Anthologies in collaboration
"The Vicar's Daughter" in Talk of the Ton  2005,04 (with Eloisa James, Rebecca Hagan Lee)
"Lucky Charm" in Hot Ticket  2006,05 (with Annette Blair, Geri Buckley and Deirdre Martin)
"The Merchant's Daughter" in The School for Heiresses 2006,12 (with Renee Bernard, Liz Carlyle, Sabrina Jeffries)
"Snowy Night with a Highlander" in Snowy Night with a Stranger  2008, (with Jane Feather, Sabrina Jeffries)

Novellas
A Christmas Secret (2011/Nov)
The Bridesmaid (2013/Oct)
One Mad Night (2015/Jan)

With Alina Adams
Guiding Light: Jonathan's Story (2007/Sep)

References

External links

List of books
Interview – "A Conversation With Julia London"
 - Bibliography

1959 births
Living people
American romantic fiction writers
Women romantic fiction writers
American women novelists
Novelists from Texas
20th-century American novelists
20th-century American women writers
20th-century pseudonymous writers
21st-century pseudonymous writers
21st-century American novelists
21st-century American women writers
Pseudonymous women writers